In mathematics, the problem of differentiation of integrals is that of determining under what circumstances the mean value integral of a suitable function on a small neighbourhood of a point approximates the value of the function at that point.  More formally, given a space X with a measure μ and a metric d, one asks for what functions f : X → R does

for all (or at least μ-almost all) x ∈ X?  (Here, as in the rest of the article, Br(x) denotes the open ball in X with d-radius r and centre x.)  This is a natural question to ask, especially in view of the heuristic construction of the Riemann integral, in which it is almost implicit that f(x) is a "good representative" for the values of f near x.

Theorems on the differentiation of integrals

Lebesgue measure 

One result on the differentiation of integrals is the Lebesgue differentiation theorem, as proved by Henri Lebesgue in 1910.  Consider n-dimensional Lebesgue measure λn on n-dimensional Euclidean space Rn.  Then, for any locally integrable function f : Rn → R, one has

for λn-almost all points x ∈ Rn.  It is important to note, however, that the measure zero set of "bad" points depends on the function f.

Borel measures on Rn 

The result for Lebesgue measure turns out to be a special case of the following result, which is based on the Besicovitch covering theorem: if μ is any locally finite Borel measure on Rn and f : Rn → R is locally integrable with respect to μ, then

for μ-almost all points x ∈ Rn.

Gaussian measures 

The problem of the differentiation of integrals is much harder in an infinite-dimensional setting.  Consider a separable Hilbert space (H, ⟨ , ⟩) equipped with a Gaussian measure γ.  As stated in the article on the Vitali covering theorem, the Vitali covering theorem fails for Gaussian measures on infinite-dimensional Hilbert spaces.  Two results of David Preiss (1981 and 1983) show the kind of difficulties that one can expect to encounter in this setting:
 There is a Gaussian measure γ on a separable Hilbert space H and a Borel set M ⊆ H so that, for γ-almost all x ∈ H, 
 There is a Gaussian measure γ on a separable Hilbert space H and a function f ∈ L1(H, γ; R) such that 

However, there is some hope if one has good control over the covariance of γ. Let the covariance operator of γ be S : H → H given by

or, for some countable orthonormal basis (ei)i∈N of H,

In 1981, Preiss and Jaroslav Tišer showed that if there exists a constant 0 < q < 1 such that

then, for all f ∈ L1(H, γ; R),

where the convergence is convergence in measure with respect to γ.  In 1988, Tišer showed that if

for some α > 5 ⁄ 2, then

for γ-almost all x and all f ∈ Lp(H, γ; R), p > 1.

As of 2007, it is still an open question whether there exists an infinite-dimensional Gaussian measure γ on a separable Hilbert space H so that, for all f ∈ L1(H, γ; R),

for γ-almost all x ∈ H.  However, it is conjectured that no such measure exists, since the σi would have to decay very rapidly.

See also

References 
 
 

Differentiation rules
Measure theory
Theorems in analysis
Theorems in calculus